Atomic TV (stylized as Atomic. and simply known as Atomic) is a Romanian television network launched on 20 November 2021 as an online livestreaming channel, and on 23 November 2021 as a television channel. The channel primarily airs music made in Romania from the 90s and 2000s, but also music from 2010s.

The channel is a revival of the original Atomic TV channel launched on 3 February 1999, rebranded as TV K Lumea on 26 June 2004, sold to SBS Broadcasting Group and rebranded as Kiss TV in 2006.

References

Television channels and stations established in 1997
Television channels and stations disestablished in 2000
Television in Romania
Television channels and stations established in 2021
Commercial-free television networks